Robert Raymond Boone (born November 19, 1947) is an American former catcher and manager in Major League Baseball (MLB) who was a four-time All-Star. 

Born in San Diego, California, he is the son of MLB player Ray Boone, and he is the father of two major leaguers: Bret Boone and Aaron Boone. All four family members were named All-Stars during their careers.

Professional career

Philadelphia Phillies 
Boone was drafted by the Philadelphia Phillies in the sixth round (126th overall) of the 1969 amateur draft after attending Stanford University where he was admitted to the Zeta Psi fraternity. He was brought to the majors in late 1972. While Boone never had excellent hitting numbers, he was an excellent defensive catcher, committing only eight errors and allowing only three passed balls in the 1977 season. Boone made the National League All-Star team three times in a Phillies uniform and helped the team win the 1980 World Series. In 1981, he batted .211/.279/.295.	

In 2005, Boone was inducted into the Philadelphia Baseball Wall of Fame.

California Angels 
In 1982, the Phillies decided to trade the veteran catcher to the California Angels following an unproductive year from Boone and also as a possible retaliation for Boone's key role in leading the players in negotiations during the 1981 Major League Baseball strike. Boone rebounded by throwing out 21 of the first 34 steal attempts and helping the Angels to the AL West title. In 1983, he made his fourth and final All-Star appearance.

On September 30, 1984, Boone caught Mike Witt's perfect game.

Kansas City Royals 
As a free agent, Boone signed with the Kansas City Royals, but a broken finger in 1990 led to his retirement at age 42 following his shortened season, in which he batted .239/.336/.265.

Boone was a career .254/.315/.346 hitter with 1,838 hits, 105 home runs (HR) and 826 runs batted in (RBI), in 2,264 games. He was selected an All-Star in 1976, 1978–79, and 1983. Boone was one of the top defensive catchers of his era, winning seven Gold Glove awards. He caught 2,225 games in a 19-year big league career, a record that lasted for three years until Carlton Fisk passed him (the record currently is held by Iván Rodríguez, with 2,427). Boone caught 117 shutouts during his career, ranking him tied for 13th all-time in 2010 among major league catchers.

Managerial career
In 1990, just after Boone retired as a player, a group trying to bring an MLB franchise to Orlando (called the Orlando SunRays) hired him to be its first manager. The job was contingent on Orlando being awarded a National League franchise to begin play in 1993; the NL instead chose Miami and Denver.

Boone returned to the Royals in 1995 as the team's manager but was let go during the 1997 season after a third straight sub-.500 season. In 2001, he was hired to be the skipper of the Cincinnati Reds, replacing Jack McKeon. However, after another two and a half sub-.500 seasons, the Reds replaced Boone with Ray Knight, on July 28, 2003.

Managerial record

Personal life
Bob and his family are descendants of American pioneer Daniel Boone. Bob Boone and his wife, Susan Boone, have three sons. Two of his sons, Aaron Boone and Bret Boone, are former Major League Baseball players. Aaron Boone is currently the manager of the New York Yankees. Bret's son Jake Boone is an infielder in the Washington Nationals minor league system.

Bob Boone's extended family have been sportsmen. His mother, Patsy Boone, was a synchronized swimmer who swam with Esther Williams in the movies. His sister Terry Boone was a champion swimmer, and his brother Rod Boone was a college baseball star who played Triple-A ball in the Astros and Royals organizations.

See also

 List of Major League Baseball career putouts as a catcher leaders
 Third-generation Major League Baseball families

References

Further reading

External links

Bob Boone at Baseball Almanac
Bob Boone at Baseball Gauge

1947 births
Living people
Major League Baseball catchers
Baseball players from San Diego
Philadelphia Phillies players
California Angels players
Kansas City Royals players
Raleigh-Durham Phillies players
Eugene Emeralds players
Kansas City Royals managers
Cincinnati Reds managers
National League All-Stars
American League All-Stars
Gold Glove Award winners
Stanford Cardinal baseball players
Washington Nationals executives
Cincinnati Reds coaches
Alaska Goldpanners of Fairbanks players